Portage la Prairie (North) Airport  is a registered aerodrome located adjacent to Portage la Prairie, Manitoba, Canada.

See also
 Portage la Prairie/Southport Airport

References

Registered aerodromes in Manitoba
Portage la Prairie